Lesser Men is the first studio album from Abel. Come&Live! Records released the album on October 19, 2010.

Critical reception

Awarding the album three and a half stars from HM, Ian Harvey states, "Abel has skillfully navigated their music between the words of the deeply spiritual and artistic ... While some of the melodies feel out of place at times, this is a strong sophomore effort by a talented band." Peter John Willoughby, rating the album a six out of ten at Cross Rhythms, says, "this release is all about spiritual soul-searching and could almost be classified as a worship album." Giving the album four and a half stars for Jesus Freak Hideout, Scott Fryberger writes, "To record nine new songs for an album that they won't make any profit on is a testimony to their dedication to spreading the message of the Gospel through their honest and beautiful music". Shawn H., awarding the album four stars by Indie Vision Music, describes, "They bring vibrantly powerful & strong lyrical presence." Rating the album three and a half stars from Louder Than the Music, Jono Davies writes, "with a background of driven indie rock the album is one to be explored." Cara Fisher, giving the album four and a half stars for CM Addict, states, "Lesser Men is one of those rare albums that offers the best of both worlds, great music and uplifting, honest lyrics. This is indie rock at its best."

Track listing

References

2010 debut albums
Abel (band) albums